Sally Jenkins (born October 22, 1960) is an American sports columnist and feature writer for The Washington Post, and author. She was previously a senior writer for Sports Illustrated. She has won the  AP Sports Columnist of the Year Award five times, received the National Press Foundation 2017 chairman citation, and was a finalist for the 2020 Pulitzer Prize. She is the author of a dozen books. Jenkins is noted for her writing on Pat Summitt, Joe Paterno, Lance Armstrong, and the United States Center for SafeSport.

Early life and education
Jenkins was born in Fort Worth, Texas, She is the daughter of Hall of Fame sportswriter Dan Jenkins, who also once wrote for Sports Illustrated. She is a 1982 graduate of Stanford University, with a degree in English literature.

Career
Jenkins is a sports columnist and feature writer for The Washington Post. She was previously a senior writer for Sports Illustrated. She was a finalist for the 2020 Pulitzer Prize. Jenkins is the author of twelve books, four of which were New York Times bestsellers, including the number 1 bestseller Sum It Up: 1098 Victories, A Couple of Irrelevant Losses and A Life In Perspective, written with legendary basketball coach Pat Summitt, and It's Not About the Bike written with bicycle racer Lance Armstrong. Her work has been featured in Smithsonian Magazine, GQ, and Sports Illustrated, and Jenkins has been a correspondent on CNBC, as well as on NPR's All Things Considered.

Joe Paterno interview and column

In January 2012, Jenkins secured an interview with Pennsylvania State University (Penn State) football coach Joe Paterno shortly before his death. During the interview, she asked him his views on the Jerry Sandusky sexual molestation allegations. Her report of the interview was published January 13, 2012. In it she drew no firm conclusions about Paterno's culpability, but simply reported his words, and those of his lawyer.  

On July 12, 2012, in a Washington Post follow-up column, after the release of the Freeh Report, she wrote: "Joe Paterno was a liar, there's no doubt about that now ... Paterno fell prey to the single most corrosive sin in sports: the belief that winning on the field makes you better and more important than other people."

Lance Armstrong
Jenkins co-wrote two best-selling autobiographies with cyclist Lance Armstrong, and defended Armstrong even after he admitted to doping and taking banned performance-enhancing substances while vehemently lying that he had done so, and was stripped of his seven Tour de France titles.  In a column titled, "Why I’m not angry at Lance Armstrong", Jenkins wrote: "And I’m confused as to why using cortisone as an anti-inflammatory in a 2,000-mile race is cheating, and I wonder why putting your own blood back into your body is the crime of the century."

SafeSport
In October 2022, Jenkins wrote a column in the Washington Post about the United States Center for SafeSport. She called SafeSport “a false front … little more than another coverup operation, a litigation-avoidance ploy and bottomless pit into which to dump complaints and disguise inaction.” In conclusion, she wrote that SafeSport is "abuser-friendly," and a sham.

Awards

It's Not About the Bike: My Journey Back to Life won the William Hill Sports Book of the Year award in 2000. It was also number one on the New York Times Best Seller list. The book was also awarded the Christopher Award for Adult Books in 2001. It also appeared in the Texas Tayshas Reading List from 2001 to 2002.

In 2001, 2003, 2010, 2011, and 2021 she won the Associated Press’s  Sports Columnist of the Year Award. In 2001, 2008, and 2011 she was named Sports Columnist of the Year by the Society of Professional Journalists. She received the National Press Foundation's chairman citation in 2017. 

In 2005 Jenkins became the first woman inducted into the National Sportscasters and Sportswriters Hall of Fame. She was inducted into the Washington DC Sports Hall of Fame in 2021. She was named the 2021 Red Smith Award winner.

Books

Personal life
Jenkins resides in Sag Harbor, New York.

References

External links
 Jenkins' page at the Washington Post

C-SPAN Q&A interview with Jenkins, March 6, 2011

1960 births
Living people
American women sportswriters
People from Fort Worth, Texas
People from Sag Harbor, New York
Red Smith Award recipients
Sports Illustrated
Sportswriters from Texas
Stanford University alumni
The Washington Post people
Writers from Texas
20th-century American journalists
20th-century American women writers
21st-century American journalists
21st-century American women writers